The Miss Oklahoma Teen USA competition is the pageant that selects the representative for the state of Oklahoma in the Miss Teen USA pageant. This pageant is directed by Vanbros and Associates, headquartered in Lenexa, Kansas. In 1997, Oklahoma joined the Vanbros group of state pageants for the Miss USA and Teen USA system.

Oklahoma is in the top 5 most successful states at Miss Teen USA in terms of number and value of placements. Oklahoma's best performance came in the 1980s through the early 1990s. After Oklahoma was taken over by Vanbros there was a six-year lapse, before Nikki Carver brought the state back into the semi-finals in 2003. The state's most recent placement was in 2019, when Abigail Billings finished in the top 15. Oklahoma has produced one Miss Teen USA, Allison Brown, who won in 1986 becoming the 4th state that won the Miss Teen USA title for the first time.

Four Oklahoma teens have crossed over to win the Miss Oklahoma USA title and compete at Miss USA, with Morgan Woolard being the most successful with a 1st runner-up placement at Miss USA 2010.

Haleigh Hurst of Norman, is a native of Decatur, Texas and a student of University of Oklahoma, was crowned Miss Oklahoma Teen USA 2022 on March 27, 2022 at OCCC Performing Arts Center in Oklahoma. She will represent Oklahoma for the title of Miss Teen USA 2022.

Gallery of titleholders

Results summary

Placements
Miss Teen USA: Allison Brown (1986)
1st runners-up: Angela Logan (1992)
3rd runners-up: RaeLynn Coffman (1987), Jessica Morgan (2012)
Top 6: Amanda Penix (1997)
Top 10: Jaime Brashier (1984), Stacy Folsum (1989), Latoya Farley (1996), Crystal Glidden (2005)
Top 12: Rachael Schilder (1991)
Top 15/16: Nikki Carver (2003), Morgan Woolard (2006), Taylor Gorton (2008), Kandis Holt (2010), Brooklynne Bond (2014), Cherokee Pearce (2015), Baylee Ogle (2017), Abigail Billings (2019), Danika Christopherson (2020), Haleigh Hurst (2022)
Oklahoma holds a record of 20 placements at Miss Teen USA.

Awards
Miss Congeniality: Shelly Forrest (1995)
Miss Photogenic: Jessica Morgan (2012), Graham Turner (2013)
Best State Costume: Haleigh Hurst (2022)

Winners 

Color key

1 Age at the time of the Miss Teen USA pageant

References

External links
Official Website

Oklahoma
Women in Oklahoma